Edward J. Vajda (Camp Lejeune, North Carolina, September 10, 1958 as Edward M. Johnson; changed his name in 1981) is a historical linguist at Western Washington University.

He is known for his work on the proposed Dené–Yeniseian language family, seeking to establish that the Ket language of Siberia has a common linguistic ancestor with the Na-Dené languages of North America. He began to study the Ket language in the 1990s, after the dissolution of the Soviet Union; he interviewed Ket speakers in Germany and later traveled to Tomsk in southwestern Siberia to perform fieldwork. In August 2008 he became the first North American to visit the Ket homeland in north-central Siberia's Turukhansky District, where he conducted intensive fieldwork with some of the remaining Ket speakers. Vajda's 67-page article "A Siberian link with Na-Dene languages" has been published in 2010 in the Anthropological Papers of the University of Alaska. His theory has earned widespread, but not universal, support among professional linguists.

Publications

Monographs

Ket (Languages of the World/Materials Volume 204.) Munich: Lincom Europa, 2004.
Mid-Holocene Language Connections between Asia and North America. Leiden: Brill, 2022 (authors: Michael Fortescue and Edward Vajda)
Yeniseian Peoples and Languages: a history of their study with an annotated bibliography and a source guide. Surrey, England: Curzon Press, 2001. (389 pages)
Ket Prosodic Phonology. (Languages of the World 15.) Munich: Lincom Europa, 2000
Morfologicheskij slovar’ ketskogo glagola na osnove juzhnoketskogo dialekta [Morphological dictionary of the Ket verb, southern dialect] (co-authored with Marina Zinn), Tomsk: TGPU, 2004. (257 pages)
Russian Punctuation and Related Symbols (co-authored with V. I. Umanets), Bloomington, Indiana: Slavica Publishers, 2005.  (249 pages)

Edited volumes
 
"Subordination and coordination strategies in North Asian languages." Current issues in linguistic theory, 300.) Amsterdam & Philadelphia: John Benjamins, 2008. (225 pp.)
Languages and Prehistory of Central Siberia. (Current issues in linguistic theory, 262.) Amsterdam & Philadelphia: John Benjamins, 2004. (275 pp.)
Studia Yeniseica: in honor of Heinrich Werner. Language typology and universals 56.1/2 (2003). Berlin: Akademie Verlag. (Co-edited with Gregory Anderson.)

Refereed journal articles

"Ket shamanism." Shaman 18.1/2: 125-143 (2010).  
"A Siberian link with Na-Dene Languages." Anthropological Papers of the University of Alaska, Volume 5, New Series. (2010): 31-99.
"Yeniseian, Na-Dene, and Historical Linguistics." Anthropological Papers of the University of Alaska, Volume 5, New Series. (2010): 100-118.  
"Dene–Yeniseian and Processes of Deep Change in Kin Terminologies." Anthropological Papers of the University of Alaska, Volume 5, New Series. (2010): 120-236. (co-authored with John W. Ives and Sally Rice)
"The languages of Siberia." Linguistic Compass 2 (2008): 1-19.
"Yeniseic diathesis" Language Typology 9 (2005): 327-339. (Review article of Die Diathese in den Jenissej-Sprachen aus typologischer Sicht, H. Werner).
"Ket verb structure in typological perspective." Sprachtypologie und Universalienforschung 56.1/2 (2003): 55-92. Berlin: Akademie Verlag.  
"The role of position class in Ket verb morphophonology." Word 52/3: 369-436 (2001).   
"Actant conjugations in the Ket verb." Voprosy jazykoznanija [Linguistic Inquiry] 67/3 (2000): 21-41.  Moscow: Nauka.

Book chapters or encyclopedia articles

"Morphology in Dene-Yeniseian Languages". In Oxford Research Encyclopedia of Linguistics. 2019.
"Loanwords in Ket." Loanwords in the World’s languages: a comparative handbook, eds. Martin Haspelmath and Uri Tadmor. Berlin: Mouton de Gruyter, 2009. pp. 471–494.
"Una relación genealógica entre las lenguas del Nuevo Mundo y de Siberia." (co-authored with Bernard Comrie) X Encuentro Internacional de Lingüística en el Noroeste: Memorias. 2009.
"Ditransitive constructions in Ket" The typology of ditransitives, ed. Bernard Comrie and Martin Haspelmath. Cambridge: Cambridge University Press, 2009.
"Siberian landscapes in Ket traditional culture." Landscape and culture in the Siberian North, ed. Peter Jordan. Cambridge: Cambridge University Press.  2009.
"Head-negating enclitics in Ket" Subordination and coordination strategies in North Asian languages, ed. Edward Vajda. 2008. Amsterdam & Philadelphia.  pp. 179–201.
"Ket morphology" 2007. Morphologies of Asia and Africa, Vol. 2, ed. Alan Kaye, pp. 1277–1325. Winona Lake, IN: Eisenbrauns.
"Losing semantic alignment: from Proto-Yeniseic to Modern Ket" The typology of semantic alignment,  eds. Tim Donohue & Soeren Wichman. Oxford: Oxford University Press.  pp. 140–161.
"Distinguishing referential from grammatical function in morphological typology." Linguistic diversity and language theories, ed. by Zygmunt Frajzyngier, David Rood, and Adam Hodges. Amsterdam & Philadelphia: John Benjamins. 2004. pp. 397–420.
"Tone and Phoneme in Ket." Current trends in Caucasian, East European and Inner Asian linguistics: Papers in Honor of Howard I. Aronson (Current issues in linguistic theory.), pp. 291–308.  Amsterdam & Philadelphia: John Benjamins, 2003. 
"Toward a typology of position class: comparing Navajo and Ket verb morphology." Proceedings from the Fourth Workshop on American Indigenous Languages Santa Barbara Papers in Linguistics, 11, ed. Jeanie Castillo, pp. 99–114. Santa Barbara, CA: University of California, Santa Barbara. (2001).
"The origin of phonemic tone in Ket." Chicago Linguistics Society 37/2: Parasession on Arctic Languages, pp. 305–320. Chicago: University of Chicago Press, 2002.
"Kazakh Phonology." Opuscula Altaica: Essays Presented in Honor of Henry Schwarz, pp. 603–650. Western Washington University, 1994. 
"A Critique of the Notion that Language Imprisons the Mind." Anthropological World: An Introduction to Cultural Anthropology, pp. 95–103, 1990.

References

External links
 March 24, 2012 Dene-Yeniseian Workshop, University of Alaska Fairbanks, Lectures by Ed VAjda and other papers now available via ANLC and UTube.''
 Table of contents and ordering information for The Dene–Yeniseian Connection.
 Notices and news items on Dene–Yeniseian
 Vajda's homepage at Western Washington University
 Video of Vajda introducing the Ket language

1958 births
Linguists from the United States
Living people
People from Bellingham, Washington
Western Washington University faculty
Linguists of Dené–Yeniseian languages
Linguists of Na-Dene languages
Linguists of Navajo
Linguists of Yeniseian languages
Paleolinguists